Luisa Ponchio (born July 5, 1961) is an Italian sprint canoer who competed in the early 1980s. At the 1980 Summer Olympics in Moscow, she was eliminated in the semifinals of the K-2 500 m event.

References
Sports-Reference.com profile

1961 births
Canoeists at the 1980 Summer Olympics
Italian female canoeists
Living people
Olympic canoeists of Italy
Place of birth missing (living people)
20th-century Italian women